The  is a full-size luxury sedan from Toyota. It is an upmarket variant of the Crown and serves as Toyota's flagship model in various countries.

The Crown Majesta appeared after the international introduction of the Celsior/Lexus LS in late 1989; the Celsior was exclusive to Toyopet Store locations on a newer platform. The Crown Majesta, positioned as a modern limousine alternative to the already existing Century and shares the flagship role, was exclusive to Toyota Japanese dealerships called Toyota Store. The Crown Majesta appeared before the Aristo/Lexus GS, which was assigned to Toyota Vista Store locations and shared the Crown and Crown Majesta platform.

The Crown Majesta shares a stretched variant of the smaller Crown platform series which is also used in the Aristo/GS, however, it is not just an upper trim level of the Crown sedan, the Majesta is a separate car with unique styling and interior treatment. The Crown Majesta was later released in other countries in Asia such as China.



First generation (S140; 1991) 

The first-generation Crown Majesta was introduced in Japan as a 4-door hardtop sedan in October 1991. It had much of its resemblance to its smaller sibling, the Crown. It also bore a resemblance to the larger Celsior, which was a sedan that appeared earlier in 1989. At first, the Crown Majesta was a trim level variant of the Crown series, called the Crown Royal Saloon G. The Majesta was a more luxurious variant of the Crown and was slightly wider and heavier, necessitating two engine choices: the 3.0-litre 2JZ-GE six-cylinder, which produced  and the 4.0-litre 1UZ-FE V8, which produced . The two engine choices gave Japanese buyers the option as to which annual road tax obligation they were willing to pay. Unlike the body-on-frame S140 hardtop, the Majesta was built using unibody construction, becoming the first model in the Crown family to adopt such a design.

In 1992, four-wheel steering was offered in compliance with the four-wheel drive system, called 4WDi-Four. This boosted handling capabilities and gave increased traction. Advanced for this time, the Crown Majesta had an optional GPS navigation system, electronic instrument cluster, electric power steering, heated front and rear electric seats, a head-up display that projected key information on the inside windshield surface above the instrument cluster, and an i-Four comprehensive vehicle control system.

A battery-electric version called the Crown Majesta EV was made as a lease vehicle in 1993.

Second generation (S150; 1995) 

The Crown Majesta underwent its first redesign in 1995. Notable enhancements were made to the taillights to distinguish the model from the lower-spec Crown. The redesign made the vehicle similar to the XF20 series Celsior/LS 400, which debuted in 1994. Changes were also made to the engine lineup. Due to cost-cutting efforts within Toyota, the list of optional equipment offered was simplified.

The second-generation Majesta is the first Toyota model to be equipped with vehicle stability control in 1995. 

At its introduction in 1996, it won the Automotive Researchers' and Journalists' Conference Car of the Year award in Japan which it shared with the 1996 Crown.

In August 1997, the front grille was restyled and HID headlights were introduced. A 5-speed automatic transmission was also introduced. Four-wheel steering was no longer offered. In addition, a two-tone paint scheme offered an upmarket image for the Crown Majesta.

Third generation (S170; 1999) 

This version was released in September 1999 and received a complete redesign, further incorporating styling elements of the Celsior/LS. Wider vertical taillights were incorporated as well as redesigned headlights, grille and minor aesthetic updates. Four-wheel steering was again offered. The previous two-tone paint scheme options remained as well as Toyota's other top-of-the-line features for this model.

DVD-based GPS navigation was also introduced, as well as an "Ottoman" footrest for the rear passenger seats. This was achieved by enabling part of the seat cushion of the front passenger seat back to tilt rearward towards the rear seat passengers.

The model came in a C-type or an A-type option, the A-type having less standard options with conventional spring and shock suspension as standard, while the C-type had more options as standard such as height adjustable air suspension, TEMS, dual zone climate control, rear wheel steering and power rear seat as standard with leather as optional. All engine variants also had the option for 4WDi-Four four-wheel drive system.

The trend among automakers towards large-diameter wheels with low-profile tires was ignored in favour of a more comfortable ride and better handling with smaller wheels. This model also made available with a 5-speed "Super ECT" automatic transmission.

It was made the official company car for senior-level Toyota management. This model also had a 10th Anniversary special edition run which was a fully optioned C-type specification model with leather and a sunroof as standard.

Fourth generation (S180; 2004) 

The fourth-generation Crown Majesta was introduced on 6 July 2004. In August 2006, the Celsior was no longer offered in Japan, due to the introduction of the Lexus brand there. The Crown Majesta replaced the Celsior, despite objections from Japanese customers. It introduced the first Vehicle Dynamics Integrated Management (VDIM) integrated vehicle handling and software control system and radar adaptive cruise control with low-speed tracking function. The engine was upgraded to the 4.3 L 3UZ-FE V8 unit, shared with the US-spec LS 430. The transmission was upgraded to a 6-speed automatic unit, the four-wheel drive system was improved, and air suspension was introduced. Intelligent adaptive front lighting and rear curtain airbags were added to improve safety. Enhancements were made to the interior of the vehicle, including a rear-view camera and parking assistance technology. A supercharger option was also offered, allowing the engine to produce .

In July 2004, the Crown Majesta introduced both a lane keeping assist and a radar pre-collision system with a single camera to improve the accuracy of collision forecast and warning and control levels.

For 2006, G-Book was added to the list of standard features, along with a rear-view camera. A departure from previous models, the two-tone paint scheme was removed to target a younger audience.

Hongqi HQ300/HQ430 

In China, this generation of the Crown Majesta was rebadged and had been sold as the Hongqi HQ300/HQ430 from 2006 to 2010, using the same engines as the Crown.

Fifth generation (S200; 2009) 

On 26 March 2009, the fifth-generation Crown Majesta was introduced. Although it was initially reported that the name "Crown" would be removed, establishing the Majesta as an independent car, this did not happen and the car remained called the Crown Majesta. The body size expanded from the previous generation, comparable to the LS.

As with the GS and LS, the 4.6-litre 1UR-FSE V8 engine is standard, however, four-wheel drive option employed the 4.3 L 3UZ-FE one. The larger engine incurs a higher road tax liability than the smaller 4.3-litre unit.

In China, FAW Toyota assembled a limited number of left-hand-drive S200 series Crown Majesta, which is called Crown Royal Saloon VIP. Another car based on the Crown was called the Hongqi H7 and has been in production since 2013.

Sixth generation (S210; 2013) 

Launched in Japan on 9 September 2013, the sixth-generation model replaced the outgoing model's V8 engine in favour of Toyota's 2GR-FXE 3.5-litre V6 hybrid powertrain shared with the L10 Lexus GS 450h sedan, plus an additional 2.5-litre 2AR-FSE four-cylinder hybrid unit for the four-wheel drive version. The elimination of the V8 engines reduced the annual road tax liability for large engine displacement. The Crown Majesta was given a redesigned appearance after the reintroduction of the Y51 series Nissan Cima in April 2012. Fuel economy is improved to  under the JC08 test cycle. The wheelbase is  longer than the corresponding Crown Royal and Athlete, but  shorter than the Century, and incorporates advanced safety and convenience equipment such as blind spot monitoring and a collision avoidance system.

The Crown Majesta was discontinued on 27 April 2018 in favour of the S220 series Crown.

References

External links 

 

Crown Majesta
Cars introduced in 1991
2000s cars
2010s cars
2020s cars
Full-size vehicles
Luxury vehicles
Sedans
Rear-wheel-drive vehicles
All-wheel-drive vehicles
Vehicles with four-wheel steering
Hybrid electric cars
Partial zero-emissions vehicles
Flagship vehicles
Cars of Japan